Saint-Pandelon is a commune in the Landes department in Nouvelle-Aquitaine in southwestern France.

Geography 
The commune is located in Chalosse on the river Luy.

Population

Sights 
 Saint-Pantaléon-et-Saint-Barthélemy Church
 The salt fountain
 Saline water
 Some castles: 
 the Ducros castle, before it was the castle of bishops, 
 the Hercular's castle, 
 the Haubardin castle, 
 the Laureta castle, 
 the Herran castle.

Local life 
Town celebration is the last week-end of August.

See also
Communes of the Landes department

References

Communes of Landes (department)